NUSHIP Arafura (OPV 203), named to represent Australia's interests in the Arafura Sea, is the lead ship of the s currently under construction for the Royal Australian Navy. The ship is based on the Lürssen OPV80 design, and is being constructed by ASC Pty Ltd at the Osborne Naval Shipyard in Osborne, South Australia. It was planned that the ship would enter service in 2022. However, as of March 2023, it is yet to be commissioned. The ship was launched at the Osborne Naval Shipyard on 16 December 2021.

References

Patrol vessels of the Royal Australian Navy
HMAS Arafura (OPV 1)